El Chañar is a settlement in Tucumán Province in northern Argentina.

Populated places in Tucumán Province